The Tunisia women's national football team is the representative women's association football team of Tunisia. Its governing body is the Tunisian Football Federation (TFF) and it competes as a member of the Confederation of African Football (CAF).

Results

2006

2007

2008

2009

2010

2011

2012

2014

2015

2016

2020

2021

2022

See also
 Tunisia national football team results
 List of Tunisia women's international footballers

References

Results
2000s in Tunisia
2010s in Tunisia
2020s in Tunisia
Women's national association football team results
Women's